Jolanda Insana (18 May 1937 – 27 October 2016) was an Italian poet and translator.

Born in Messina, in 1968 Insana moved to Rome where she graduated in  Ancient Literature with a thesis on Erinna's The Distaff. Active as translator of classical and contemporary authors, she debuted as a poet in 1977, with the collection Sciarra amara ("Bitter Harvest"). In 2002 she won the Viareggio Prize for poetry for La stortura.

Giovanni Raboni described Insana's poetic style as "visionary concreteness".

References

External links   
 Jolanda Insana at Treccani

1937 births
2016 deaths
Writers from Messina
Italian women poets
20th-century Italian poets
21st-century Italian poets
Viareggio Prize winners
Sapienza University of Rome alumni
20th-century Italian women writers
20th-century Italian translators
21st-century Italian women writers